The 1975 All-Southwest Conference football team consists of American football players chosen by various organizations for All-Southwest Conference teams for the 1975 NCAA Division I football season.  The selectors for the 1975 season included the Associated Press (AP).

All Southwest selections

Offense

Split ends
 Mike Renfro, TCU (AP-1)

Tackles
 Bob Simmons, Texas (AP-1)
 Henry Sheppard, SMU (AP-1)

Guards
 R. C. Thielemann, Arkansas (AP-1)
 Will Wilcox, Texas (AP-1)

Centers
 Richard LaFargue, Arkansas (AP-1)

Tight ends
 Pat Felux, Texas Tech (AP-1)

Quarterbacks
 Marty Atkins, Texas (AP-1)

Running backs
 Earl Campbell, Texas (AP-1)
 Bubba Bean, Texas A&M (AP-1)
 Ike Forte, Arkansas (AP-1)

Defense

Defensive ends
 Blake Schwarz, Texas A&M (AP-1)
 Johnnie Meadors, Arkansas (AP-1)

Defensive tackles
 Edgar Fields, Texas A&M (AP-1)
 Brad Shearer, Texas (AP-1)

Nose guards
 Ecomet Burley, Texas Tech (AP-1)

Linebackers
 Ed Simonini, Texas A&M (AP-1)
 Garth Ten Napel, Texas A&M (AP-1)
 Bill Hamilton, Texas (AP-1)

Defensive backs
 Pat Thomas, Texas A&M (AP-1)
 Raymmond Clayborn, Texas (AP-1)
 Lester Hayes, Texas A&M (AP-1)
 Jackie Williams, Texas A&M (AP-1)

Special teams

Punters
 Russell Erxleben, Texas (AP-1)

Placekickers
 Steve Little, Arkansas (AP-1)

Key
AP = Associated Press

See also
1975 College Football All-America Team

References

All-Southwest Conference
All-Southwest Conference football teams